The 7th CC.NN. Division "Cirene" was an Italian CC.NN. (Blackshirts militia) division raised on 27 April 1936 for the Second Italo-Ethiopian War against Ethiopia and disbanded on 15 September 1936 after the war's end. The name "Cirene" was chosen to commemorate the Roman city of Cyrene located in the Cyrenaica, where the division was deployed. The division's commander was Lieutenant General Guido Scandolara.   The division was deployed in Libya during the war against Abyssinia to threaten the Suez Canal should the British close it to Italian traffic. It was never deployed to Abyssinia, but was considered to take part in the campaign. It actually acted as a local garrison and engaged in various construction projects.

Organization 
Below follows the division's organization during the Second Italo-Ethiopian War and the cities, in which its CC.NN. battalions and companies/batteries were raised.

 7th CC.NN. Division "Cirene" 
 190th CC.NN. Legion "Pisa", in Pisa
 Command Company
 CXC CC.NN. Battalion
 CCCXLI CC.NN. Battalion, in Caserta
 196th CC.NN. Legion "Petrarca", in Arezzo
 Command Company
 CXCVI CC.NN. Battalion, in Arezzo
 CCXLV CC.NN. Battalion, in Castellammare di Stabia
 198th CC.NN. Legion "Maremma", in Grosseto
 Command Company
 CXCVIII CC.NN. Battalion, in Grosseto
 CCXL CC.NN. Battalion, in Salerno
 219th CC.NN. Legion "Ricciotti", in Frosinone
 Command Company
 CCXIX CC.NN. Battalion, in Frosinone
 CCXLIV CC.NN. Battalion, in Avellino
 241st CC.NN. Legion "Volturno", in Caserta
 Command Company
 CCVII CC.NN. Battalion, in Zadar
 CCXLI CC.NN. Battalion, in Caserta
 267th CC.NN. Legion "Etna", in Catania
 Command Company
 CCXLVIII CC.NN. Battalion, in Foggia
 CCLXVII CC.NN. Battalion, in Catania
 271st CC.NN. Legion "Vespri", in Palermo
 Command Company
 CCLXXI CC.NN. Battalion, in Palermo
 CCLXXVI CC.NN. Battalion, in Cagliari
 352nd CC.NN. Legion "Acciaiata", in Lecce
 Command Company
 CCCLII CC.NN. Battalion, in Lecce
 CCCLXIII CC.NN. Battalion, in Reggio Calabria
 7th Motorized Artillery Regiment (Royal Italian Army)
 Command Unit
 3x Artillery groups
 Ammunition and Supply Unit
 VII Mixed Transport Unit (Royal Italian Army)
 VII Supply Unit (Royal Italian Army)
 2x CC.NN. replacement battalions
 180th CC.NN. Machine Gun Company
 180th CC.NN. Artillery Battery (65/17 infantry support guns)
 4th Artillery Battery (65/17 infantry support guns, Royal Italian Army)
 7th Special Engineer Company (Royal Italian Army)
 7th Medical Section (Royal Italian Army)
 7th Logistic Section (Royal Italian Army)
 7th Carabinieri Section

References

Sources 
 Ettore Lucas and Giorgio de Vecchi, "Storia delle Unità Combattenti della MVSN 1923-1943", Giovanni Volpe Editore, 1976. pages 63 to 116 plus errata.

External links 
  Regio Esercito: Divisione CC.NN. "Cirene"

Blackshirt divisions of Italy
Divisions of Italy in World War II
Divisions of Italy of the Second Italo-Ethiopian War